Elemore Morgan Jr. (August 6, 1931 – May 18, 2008) was an American painter, photographer, and educator. He was recognized in the Southern United States as a leading contemporary landscape artist. He was a professor of art at University of Louisiana at Lafayette, from 1965 until 1998. His paintings of rice farms in Vermilion Parish have been widely exhibited, from Paris to Los Angeles.

Life
Elemore Morgan Jr. was born on August 6, 1931 in Baton Rouge, Louisiana, he was an only child, and he was raised on his grandfather's farm. His upbringing shaped his affinity for nature and the rural life in Louisiana. His father Elemore Morgan Sr. influenced his decision to become an artist. His father was a full-time photographer, had also worked and farmed with Louisiana architect A. Hays Town.

At Louisiana State University and studied art, under the tutelage of Caroline Durieux, Ralston Crawford, and David LeDoux.

For two years he served in the United States Air Force as a supply officer during the Korean War. With the help of the GI Bill, Morgan studied art at the Ruskin School of Art at the University of Oxford in England. In 1959 he returned to Louisiana, he began working in Lafayette with longtime friend and architect Neil Nehrbass.

Work 
He served as an associate professor from 1965 to 1998 at the University of Louisiana at Lafayette (then named the University of Southwestern Louisiana).

Morgan was renowned for his en plein air landscape paintings often in the heart of the rice growing region of southwest Louisiana. Many of Morgan’s landscapes were acrylic on oddly shaped Masonite panels, cut to fit his vision of the land, which he felt were integral to the design and composition of his works.

Morgan mused that his sense of nature affected his subject: "If you have more nature and less man, it’s going to have a certain effect on you. If you live in the city and you hardly see the sky, you’re going to think different. From growing up on that family farm and getting a real strong dose of nature, I need it to function. I also find that I’m in much better shape mentally if I’m out in nature on a regular basis."

Morgan's paintings and drawings were featured in "Where Land Meets Sky," an exhibit at the Paul and Lulu Hilliard University Art Museum, The University of Louisiana at Lafayette. The exhibit combined his works with the poetry of Darrell Bourque. It ran May 28-July 31, 1999. A book published on the exhibit includes an essay by Dr. Steven Bradley.

In 2007, Louisiana artist Brian Guidry traveled with Morgan to New York City to help facilitate Morgan’s America series.

Morgan received the Distinguished Artist award by the Delgado Society, of the New Orleans Museum of Art (2000); was named in Outstanding Achievement in the Arts award by the Acadiana Arts Council (1990); and Outstanding Undergraduate Teaching award by the Amoco Foundation (1984–1985).

Death and legacy 
Elemore Morgan died on May 18, 2008, after a complicated heart surgery at the University of Maryland Medical Center in Baltimore, Maryland.

In 2010, the state of Louisiana declared September 18 as "Elemore Morgan Day".

Publications 
Morgan contributed photography for a book titled, Makers of Cajun Music: Musiciens Cadiens Et Creoles (1984), written by Cajun folklorist Barry Jean Ancelet.

See also 

 List of Cajuns

References

External links
Elemore Morgan Jr.
Elemore Morgan Jr., August 6, 1931 – May 18, 2008
Arthur Roger Gallery
Louisiana Life profile

1931 births
2008 deaths
Alumni of the Ruskin School of Art
Louisiana State University alumni
20th-century American painters
American male painters
21st-century American painters
20th-century American photographers
University of Louisiana at Lafayette faculty
Cajun people
Artists from Baton Rouge, Louisiana
20th-century American male artists